Marcus Ornellas (born May 19, 1982) is a Brazilian actor. He is best known for working on Mexican telenovelas. Ornellas currently lives in Mexico City, Mexico.

Personal life 
Ornellas has a relationship with Mexican actress Ariadne Diaz since 2015. In May 2016 his first son was born named Diego, whom he had with Díaz.

Filmography

References

External links 
 

Living people
Brazilian male telenovela actors
Brazilian male television actors
1982 births